Corey May is an American video game writer. He is currently the Narrative Director for Austin video game developer Certain Affinity. May is also the co-founder and President of Sekretagent Productions, a production company based in Los Angeles, California working in the film, video game, and internet industries. May is the main writer of the Assassin's Creed series.
May worked as the lead writer on Assassin's Creed, Assassin's Creed II, and Assassin's Creed III. Corey May also helped Jeffrey Yohalem as a writer on Assassin's Creed: Brotherhood, and Darby McDevitt on Assassin's Creed: Revelations. May helped Jeffrey Yohalem once again on Assassin's Creed Syndicate, making it the last game he worked on before departing from Ubisoft. May also helps in the production of most other entries into the Assassin's Creed franchise to make sure everything flows together into one coherent narrative.

May graduated from Harvard University in 1999 and founded Sekretagent with Dooma Wendschuh upon their graduation from the University of Southern California's Peter Stark Producing Program in 2001.

Along with Dooma Wendschuh, May has co-written for video games such as Prince of Persia: Warrior Within, Prince of Persia: The Two Thrones, Army of Two and Terminator Salvation. He also was an executive producer on the 2006 horror film The Plague, was a producer on the 2002 film Yo, Tyrone.

He and Wendschuh wrote the Batman video game developed by WB Games Montréal, Batman: Arkham Origins, a prequel to Rocksteady Studios Batman video games: Batman: Arkham Asylum, Batman: Arkham City and Batman: Arkham Knight.

Biography

Early life 
Corey May was raised near Hollywood. May's interest in films, comics, games and anime came from a young age. However, his family wanted him to initially attend Harvard University to become a doctor. May failed in Chem 5 and realized that medicine wasn't his future. May then decided to take BA and several English courses, including literature courses and creative writing courses. He took a class on Eastern European science fiction and read many books, but still intended to be an investment banker or a trader. In the summers, May took jobs at a variety of banks in New York City, but was rejected several times due to his appearance. However, he did receive a job to copy edit reports and journal articles.

Career

Sekretagent Productions 
After college in early 2000s, May decided to apply to the Peter Stark Producing program at USC. At USC, May met his business partner, Dooma Wendschuh, and after graduation they made their production company official. They printed business cards and letterhead. Thanks to some contacts made during a Disney internship, the duo sold its first project to Disney: a re-envisioned live-action The Wind in the Willows. Many writers and directors including Guillermo del Toro have been attached.

Ubisoft (2004-2011) 
Off the success of the first project, the duo signed with a film agency. The agency received many requests for writing on video games. Having loved the medium since childhood, May decided they should at least take the meetings, where he first met Ubisoft. May and Wendschuh pitched Ubisoft an animated television show based on Rayman. Despite rejecting the pitch, the executives did like May, and invited him to visit Montreal. After the critical success of Prince of Persia: The Sands of Time and Beyond Good & Evil, the publisher wanted May to help with the next Prince of Persia game, Prince of Persia: Warrior Within.

May then started working on Assassin's Creed for four years. "It was this big crazy weird super ambitious monstrosity. How are we going to go from what's in the creative director's head to what's on a disc? [...] As time went on I was more and more involved with the franchise, charting some of the aspects of its future. Not just writing on the games but overseeing the narrative elements of the brand as a whole," said May.

Alice (2011-Present) 

Alice was originally formed in 2011 by Yves Jacquier, Ubisoft's director of production services. Alice's main goal was to improve stories in Ubisoft games. "It is a resource composed of talent scouts, motion capture masters, research and development engineers, sound mixers and narrative guides," reads a report from Alice.

The first game to see significant support from Alice was Watch Dogs. Michael Mando, who played Vaas in Far Cry 3, was also motion captured in Alice.

Video games

Awards and nominations

References

External links
 

American film producers
American video game designers
Video game writers
Place of birth missing (living people)
Year of birth missing (living people)
Living people
Harvard University alumni
USC School of Cinematic Arts alumni
Ubisoft people